is a Japanese former professional Grand Prix motorcycle road racer.

Originally from Fujisawa, Kanagawa Prefecture, Shimizu won the 1987 250cc All Japan Road Race Championship. He began his Grand Prix career with a win in 1987. His best season was in 1991, when he finished fifth in the 250cc world championship, riding on a Honda.

Motorcycle Grand Prix Results
Points system from 1969 to 1987:

Points system from 1988 to 1992:

(key) (Races in bold indicate pole position; races in italics indicate fastest lap)

References 

1964 births
Living people
People from Fujisawa, Kanagawa
Japanese motorcycle racers
250cc World Championship riders